Choristoneura metasequoiacola is a species of moth of the family Tortricidae. It is found in Hubei, China.

The wingspan is 16 mm for males and 18 mm for females. The forewings are dark brown with a metallic lustre. The hindwings are light brown.  Adults have been recorded on wing from July and August.

The larvae feed on Metasequoia glyptostroboides.

References

Moths described in 1983
Choristoneura
Moths of Asia